Jensen Hill is a mountain located in the Catskill Mountains of New York southeast of Hancock. Rattlesnake Hill is located north, Bouchoux Hill is located northwest, Big Fork Mountain is located northwest, and Taylor Hill is located east-northeast of Jensen Hill.

References

Mountains of Delaware County, New York
Mountains of New York (state)